William Wagstaffe (1685 – 5 May 1725) was a British physician.

Wagstaffe was born in Cublington, Buckinghamshire, UK, The only son of the town's rector, and related to the Wagstaffe family of Knightcote, Warwickshire. He was educated at a school in Northampton, entered Lincoln College, Oxford in 1701, graduated B.A. (16 June 1704) and M.A. (5 May 1707). The same year, he joined the London "practice of physics" of his relative Thomas Wagstaffe. He married Thomas' daughter and, after her early death, married the daughter of surgeon Charles Bernard.

On 8 July 1714, Wagstaffe graduated M.B. and M.D. at Oxford. He became fellow of the Royal College of Physicians on 22 December 1718, and was a censor in 1720. He became reader on anatomy to the Barber-Surgeons on 15 December 1715, and succeeded Salisbury Cade as physician to St. Bartholomew's Hospital on 29 December 1720. He became a fellow of the Royal Society on 13 March 1718.

Wagstaffe died in Bath.

Works 
 A Comment upon The History of Tom Thumbe (1711)
 A Letter showing the Danger and Uncertainty of inoculating the Small Pox (1722)

External links 
 
 Chalmer's Biography (1812)
 Miscellaneous works of Dr. William Wagstaffe at Google books
 
 

1685 births
1725 deaths
People from Buckinghamshire (before 1974)
English surgeons
British medical researchers
Fellows of the Royal Society
Fellows of the Royal College of Physicians
17th-century English people
18th-century English medical doctors
Alumni of Lincoln College, Oxford